Silvestro "Silvio" Proto (born 23 May 1983) is a Belgian former professional footballer who played as a goalkeeper.

Career
Proto spent the majority of his career with Anderlecht, for whom he made over 300 appearances, won 13 trophies and served as captain for two seasons between 2005 and 2016. His other previous clubs include R.A.C.S. Couillet, Olympic Charleroi, La Louvière, Germinal Beerschot, KV Oostende and Olympiacos.

He has also represented the Belgium national team, earning 13 caps between 2004 and 2011. He was called up as a replacement for the injured Koen Casteels for Belgium's 2014 FIFA World Cup squad. However, he himself got injured and was then replaced by Sammy Bossut.

On 28 September 2008, while playing for Germinal Beerschot, he scored a last minute equalizer in the 2–2 draw with Gent for the Belgian First Division.

Personal life
Proto is of part Sicilian descent and practises ventriloquism.

Career statistics

Club

Honours

Club 
La Louvière
Belgian Cup: 2002–03

Anderlecht
Belgian First Division (6): 2005–06, 2006–07, 2009–10, 2011–12, 2012–13, 2013–14
Belgian Cup: 2007–08
Belgian Supercup (6): 2006, 2007, 2010, 2012, 2013, 2014

Lazio
Coppa Italia: 2018–19
Supercoppa Italiana: 2019

Individual 
Belgian Professional Goalkeeper of the Season: 2004-05, 2011-12, 2012-13
Goal of the Season: 2008
Belgian Bronze Shoe: 2012, 2013
Belgian Goalkeeper of the Year: 2013
DH The Best RSC Anderlecht Team Ever: 2020

References

External links

Silvio Proto naar KV Oostende: "Had nood aan nieuwe uitdaging", nieuwsblad.be, 15 June 2016

1983 births
Living people
Sportspeople from Charleroi
Footballers from Hainaut (province)
Belgian footballers
R. Olympic Charleroi Châtelet Farciennes players
R.A.A. Louviéroise players
R.S.C. Anderlecht players
Beerschot A.C. players
K.V. Oostende players
Olympiacos F.C. players
S.S. Lazio players
Belgium international footballers
Belgium under-21 international footballers
Belgium youth international footballers
Belgian Pro League players
Super League Greece players
Serie A players
Association football goalkeepers
Belgian people of Sicilian descent
Belgian expatriate footballers
Belgian expatriate sportspeople in Greece
Expatriate footballers in Greece
Belgian expatriate sportspeople in Italy
Expatriate footballers in Italy